David Thomas Lewis (April 25, 1912 – September 28, 1983) was a United States circuit judge of the United States Court of Appeals for the Tenth Circuit.

Education and career
Born in Salt Lake City, Utah, Lewis received a Bachelor of Arts degree from the University of Utah in 1935 and a Juris Doctor from the S.J. Quinney College of Law at the University of Utah in 1937. He was in private practice in Salt Lake City from 1938 to 1950. He was in the United States Army after World War II, from April 1945 to January 1946 where he joined as a private and served in the Criminal Investigation Division. He was a member of the Utah House of Representatives from 1947 to 1948. He was a Utah state district judge from 1950 to 1956.

Federal judicial service
Lewis was nominated by President Dwight D. Eisenhower on May 17, 1956, to a seat on the United States Court of Appeals for the Tenth Circuit vacated by Judge Orie Leon Phillips. He was confirmed by the United States Senate on June 4, 1956, and received his commission on June 5, 1956. He served as Chief Judge and a member of the Judicial Conference of the United States from 1970 to 1977. He assumed senior status on December 3, 1977. Lewis served in that capacity until his death on September 28, 1983, in Salt Lake City.

References

Sources

1912 births
1983 deaths
20th-century American lawyers
20th-century American politicians
20th-century American judges
Judges of the United States Court of Appeals for the Tenth Circuit
S.J. Quinney College of Law alumni
Members of the Utah House of Representatives
United States court of appeals judges appointed by Dwight D. Eisenhower
University of Utah alumni
Utah state court judges
United States Army soldiers